The Free Church of England (FCE) is an episcopal church based in England. The church was founded when a number of congregations separated from the established Church of England in the middle of the 19th century.

The doctrinal basis of the FCE, together with its episcopal structures, organisation, worship, ministry and ethos are recognisably "Anglican" although it is not a member of the Anglican Communion. Its worship style follows that of the Book of Common Prayer or conservative modern-language forms that belong to the Anglican tradition.

Although predating it, the FCE is generally considered to be a part of the Continuing Anglican movement.

The Church of England acknowledges the FCE as a church with valid Orders and its canons permit a range of shared liturgical and ministerial activities.

History
The Free Church of England was founded principally by Evangelical or Low Church clergy and congregations in response to what were perceived as attempts (inspired by the Oxford Movement) to re-introduce medieval Roman Catholic dogmas and practices into the Established Church. The first congregation was formed by the Revd. James Shore at St John's Church Bridgetown, Totnes, Devon, in 1844. A number of additional congregations were soon established in the West Country.

In the early years, clergy were often provided by the Countess of Huntingdon's Connexion which had its origins in the 18th century Evangelical Revival. By the middle of the 19th century the Connexion still retained many Anglican features such as the use of the surplice and the Book of Common Prayer. In 1863 the annual conference of the Countess of Huntingdon's Connexion created a constitution for the new congregations under the title "The Free Church of England" (though the name had been in use since the 1840s).

The constitution made provision for the creation of dioceses, each to be under the oversight of a bishop. The first bishop was Benjamin Price, who initially had oversight of all the new congregations.

In 1874 the FCE made contact with the newly organised Reformed Episcopal Church in North America.  The founding bishop of the REC, George David Cummins, had been strongly influenced by William Augustus Muhlenberg, who advocated "Evangelical Catholicism" as a means of combining the best of both the Evangelical and Catholic traditions.  In 1876 an REC bishop from Canada, Edward Cridge, came to the United Kingdom and consecrated Benjamin Price and John Sugden in the historic succession. The following year a branch of the REC was founded in the UK.

The two churches lived in parallel until 1927, when the Free Church of England united with the UK branch of the Reformed Episcopal Church. The full name of the united church since 1927 is "The Free Church of England", otherwise called the Reformed Episcopal Church in the United Kingdom of Great Britain and Northern Ireland.

In 1956, the FCE published a revision of the Book of Common Prayer to form the primary text of the denomination's liturgy. The stated intention of the revision was to remove or explain "particular phrases and expressions" from the Church of England's 1662 edition of the prayer book that "afford at least plausible ground for the teaching and practice of the Sacerdotal and Romanising Party."

In 2003, due to the adoption of High Church practices by the FCE, two bishops and ten congregations split from the main Church (though three have returned - the current FCE churches in Exeter, Middlesbrough and Oswaldtwistle) and formed the Evangelical Connexion of the Free Church of England. Two churches in Farnham and Teddington having become independent altogether, the ECFCE currently has five churches in Fleetwood, Leeds, Leigh-on-Sea, Tuebrook (Liverpool) and Workington.

In 2020 eight Churches that were part of the main body of the Free Church of England left to operate independently. They reject the rule of the current Primus John Fenwick and are organised under their own co-ordinator, the Rev Grahame Wray of Leeds. The Connexion holds to the character and government of the FCE (episcopal, liturgical, and Evangelical) and its understanding of the founding principles of being Anglican, Calvinist, Reformed, Evangelical, and Presbyterian. Reunification with the main body of the FCE is only likely to take place after the retirement of the current FCE Primus, due to members of the Connexion believing that he has imposed on the Church a different model of leadership.

Organisation
The Free Church of England is a conventional Anglican church body, worshipping in the Low Church tradition and holding to the principles of the Book of Common Prayer and the Thirty-Nine Articles. Presbyters and deacons wear surplice, scarf and hood; bishops wear rochet and chimere, though a wider range of liturgical vesture is in use.

The church has recently created the category of "associate congregations". These are pre-existing groups of Christians who have come under the oversight of the FCE bishops but continue their existing liturgical practice.

Some of the parishes have youth activities of various kinds. Each congregation elects churchwardens and delegates who, together with the clergy, constitute the diocesan synod and annual convocation.

The provision of contemporary language liturgies has been approved by convocation and a process of drafting and authorisation has begun. The church has continued to ordain bishops in the apostolic succession, with Moravian, Church of England and Malankara Orthodox Syrian Church bishops taking part on occasion.

The presiding bishop is chosen annually by convocation and has the title "Bishop Primus".  Only baptised males are ordained to Holy Orders as bishops, presbyters, and deacons, or admitted to the public teaching office of Reader. In 2017, there were 26 clergy (excluding retirees) and around 900 members of the FCE in England.

The Central Board of Trustees for the denomination, The Free Church of England Central Trust, operates as a registered UK charity (No. 271151) and is a company limited by guarantee with no share capital. It holds as loans funds deposited by the churches for investment and lends money and makes grants to further the objects and work of the FCE.

Dioceses
The united church enjoyed modest growth in the first part of the 20th century, having at one point 90 congregations, but after the Second World War, like most other denominations in the UK, suffered a decline in numbers, though there has been a modest increase in the number of congregations in recent years. Currently, the Free Church of England has two dioceses in England (designated North and South) and one in South America, comprising congregations in Brazil and Venezuela. There are 18 churches in England, divided between the two dioceses. The bishop of the Northern Diocese is John Fenwick, while the bishop of the Southern Diocese is Paul Hunt. The 18 UK churches are located as follows:

Northern Diocese 
Diocesan website:

Bishops:
 –1917: William Troughton
 1927–1958: Frank Vaughan
 1958–1967: Thomas Cameron
 1967–1973: James Burrell
 1973–1998: Cyril Milner
 1999–2003: Arthur Bentley-Taylor
 2003–2006: John McLean
 2006–present: John Fenwick

St Stephen's, Middlesbrough closed its building in 2017. The church continued to meet in a community centre but closed in 2021.

Southern Diocese
Diocesan website:

Bishops:
 1889–1896: Benjamin Price
 1896–1901: Samuel Dicksee
 1904–1927: Richard Brook Lander
 1927–1934: Joseph Fenn
 1934–1955: John Magee
 1955–1968: George Forbes-Smith
 1968–1971: Ambrose Bodfish
 1972–1976: William Watkins
 1977–1990: Arthur Ward
 1990–2006: Kenneth Powell
 2007–present: Paul Hunt
Churches:

Christ Church in Crowborough, East Sussex was founded in 1879 and remained in use by the Free Church of England until the early 21st century.  It is now an independent Evangelical church.

Emmanuel Anglican Church, Tunbridge Wells, was founded in 2016 and joined the FCE in 2019. Its minister, Peter Sanlon, had previously been a Church of England minister. In May 2021 the church announced it was withdrawing from the FCE following concerns about governance in the FCE and the conduct of Bishop John Fenwick. The same decision was taken by Christ Church, Exmouth (founded 1896; minister Josep Rosello), and Christ Church Balham (founded in 2002 as an independent Anglican church; joined FCE 2019).

St Peter's, Croydon, was a new FCE church in 2018, but it is no longer listed on the diocesan website.

South American Diocese
The work in South America, comprising 25 congregations, was recognised as an Overseas Diocese by the Convocation held in June 2018. The 16 Brazilian congregations are registered as the Anglican Reformed Church of Brazil (IARB), with the other 9 located in Venezuela. The Bishop of the Diocese is the Right Revd. Josep Rossello; Bishop Rossello is married with one daughter and lives in Exmouth.

Brazil:
Anglican Mission of Manaus, Manaus, Amazonas 
Anglican Church of Bragança Paulista, Bragança Paulista, São Paulo 
Renovo Anglican Church, Pindamonhangaba, São Paulo 
Good Samaritan Anglican Mission, Recanto das Emas, Federal District
Holy Trinity Anglican Church, São Paulo, São Paulo
Re.Novo Anglican Mission, São José dos Campos, São Paulo 
Restoration Anglican Church, Ceilândia, Federal District 
Reformed Anglican Community in Salvador (Salvador/Bahia)
On 5 May 2021, the South American Diocese withdrew from the FCE, citing a 'total loss of confidence in the leadership of the FCE' and 'abuses of power committed by Bishop John Fenwick.'

Overseas churches
From the 19th century congregations of the Free Church of England have been planted in other parts of the world, though most of these have not survived. Currently, there are congregations in Russia (under the oversight of Paul Hunt, Bishop of the Southern Diocese) and France (where there is a commissary of the Bishop Primus).

Russia:
Christ the Saviour, St Petersburg. Minister: The Revd Sergei Makov
France:
St Martin, Moussac & Montmorrillon, under the oversight of the Revd Robert Leone, Commissary to the Bishop Primus

Recognition of orders
In January 2013 it was announced that the Church of England had recognised the holy orders of the Free Church of England. This move followed approximately three years of contact between the bishops of the Free Church of England, the Council for Christian Unity and the Faith and Order Commission. The recognition was not voted on by the General Synod but was endorsed by the standing committee of the House of Bishops. John McLean, the then Bishop Primus of the Free Church of England, said: "We are grateful to the archbishops for this recognition of our common episcopal heritage. I pray that it will not be an end in itself, but will lead to new opportunities for proclaiming the Gospel." Christopher Hill, Bishop of Guildford and chair of the Church of England's Council for Christian Unity, said: "I hope there will be good relations between us and especially in those places where there is a Free Church of England congregation."

Recognition of the orders of the Free Church of England under the Overseas and Other Clergy (Ministry and Ordination) Measure 1967 means that FCE clergy are eligible to be given permission under that measure to officiate in the Church of England, subject to such procedures and authorisations as may be required. A number have been so authorised while remaining clergy of the FCE in good standing. The measure also permits FCE bishops to ordain and perform other episcopal functions at the request of the bishop of a diocese in the provinces of Canterbury and York, subject to the consent of the relevant archbishop. In recent years, FCE bishops have licensed clergy of the Church of England to officiate in FCE contexts while remaining members of the Established Church.

Relationships
The FCE is in communion with the Reformed Episcopal Church, which itself is now a member of the Anglican Church in North America. Within the UK the FCE is a member of the Free Churches Group and Churches Together in England. From 1992 to 1997 the FCE was in official dialogue with the Church of England, which the 1998 Lambeth Conference saw as a sign of hope. It is a Designated Church under the Church of England's Ecumenical Relations Measure 1988.

FCE bishops have attended the enthronements of George Carey, Rowan Williams and Justin Welby as Archbishops of Canterbury. Since 2013, the Free Church of England has been in dialogue with the conservative Old Catholic Churches of the Union of Scranton for a time.

Anglican realignment
The FCE has been involved in the realignments within the Anglican Communion. In 2009 the Church was represented at the launch of the Fellowship of Confessing Anglicans (UK & Ireland), the local expression of the GAFCON movement inaugurated the previous year in Jerusalem. In October 2013, the Bishop Primus John Fenwick attended the second Global Anglican Future Conference (GAFCON 2) in Nairobi. He has been consulted in the restructuring of GAFCON UK (the successor body to the Fellowship of Confessing Anglicans (UK & Ireland)) under the leadership of Bishop Andy Lines, the ACNA Missionary Bishop endorsed by the GAFCON Primates. 

In February 2016, Foley Beach, Archbishop of the Anglican Church in North America, signed an instrument declaring the Anglican Church in North America to be in full communion with the Free Church of England, and recognising 'their congregations, clergy, and sacraments, while pledging to work together for the proclamation of the Good News of Jesus Christ and the making of his disciples throughout the world'. Archbishop Beach's declaration was ratified by the Provincial Council of the ACNA in June 2016. 

In June 2017, Archbishop Beach attended the annual Convocation of the Free Church of England and a special service to mark the 90th anniversary of the union of the original Free Church of England with the UK branch of the Reformed Episcopal Church. Also in 2017 the Free Church of England hosted three 'Anglican Unity Fora' in an attempt to bring together orthodox Anglicans in a common witness in the UK. That now continues under the umbrella of the re-structured GAFCON UK. In June 2018 a delegation of seven FCE members (including two bishops) attended GAFCON III, in Jerusalem.

Important personalities associated with the FCE 

 Calvin Robinson, political commentator and broadcaster. Currently serving as a deacon at Christ Church, Harlesden. Formerly a minister in training for the Church of England, Robinson was denied ordination in 2022 and joined the FCE, where he was ordained as a deacon.

References

External links

 Evangelical Connexion of the Free Church of England

 Igreja Anglicana Reformada do Brasil 
 Free Church of England Book of Common Prayer (1956) digitized by Richard Mammana

Religious organisations based in England
Christian denominations in England
Evangelical Anglicanism
History of the Church of England
Anglicanism in the United Kingdom
Anglican realignment denominations
Religious organizations established in 1844
1844 establishments in England
Reformed denominations in the United Kingdom
Anglican organizations established in the 19th century